Plaesiomyidae is a family of extinct lamp shells belonging to the order Orthida.

Fossil record
Fossils of Plaesiomyidae are found in marine strata from the Ordovician until the Silurian  (age range: from 478.6 to 418.7 years ago.).

Genera
†Austinella  Foerste, 1909
†Bokotorthis  Popov et al., 2000
†Campylorthis  Ulrich and Copper, 1942
†Chaulistomella
†Dinorthis  Hall and Clarke, 1892
†Evenkina
†Madiorthis  Zuykov and Harper, 2008
†Metorthis 
†Multicostella
†Plaesiomys  Hall and Clarke, 1892
†Retrorsirostra  Schuchert and Cooper, 1932
†Valcourea

References

Prehistoric protostome families
Prehistoric brachiopods
Brachiopod families
Ordovician first appearances
Silurian extinctions